La Visa Loca is a 2005 Filipino comedy-drama film directed by Mark Meily, produced by Sharon Cuneta, and starring Robin Padilla, Rufa Mae Quinto and Johnny Delgado. The plot concerns a taxi driver who dreams of going to the United States.

Plot
Jess Huson (Robin Padilla) is a Filipino taxi driver who dreamed of obtaining a visa to be able to go to the United States. Jess meets his ex-girlfriend (Rufa Mae Quinto) and her young son Jason (Kurt Perez) who might actually be his. However, his visa application was denied. Jess's aging but randy diabetic father (Johnny Delgado) spends his days watching TV. One day, the famous TV host Nigel Adams came to the Philippines and Jess becomes his guide. He learns Nigel's brother was the one who operated one of the biggest nursing aid agencies in the US East Coast.

Cast
Robin Padilla as Jess Huson
Johnny Delgado as Papang
Rufa Mae Quinto as Mara
Paul Holme as Nigel Adams
David Shannon as David
Kurt Perez as Jason
RJ Padilla as Young Jess

Film name
The name of the film is a reference to one of Ricky Martin's famous songs, "Livin' la Vida Loca".

External links
 

2005 films
Philippine comedy-drama films
2000s Tagalog-language films
2005 comedy-drama films
2000s English-language films
Films directed by Mark Meily